Peter Bryant (1923–2006) was a British TV producer.

Peter Bryant may also refer to:

 P. James Bryant (Peter James Bryant, fl. 1898–1929), American pastor
 Peter James Bryant (fl. from 1989), American actor
 Peter Bryant, pseudonym of Peter George (author) (1924–1966), Welsh author
 Peter Bryant (1767–1820), American doctor and politician, father of William Cullen Bryant and Cyrus Bryant

See also

 Bryant (surname)
 Peter (disambiguation)
 Bryant (disambiguation)